Bradley Darryl Wong (born October 24, 1960) is an American actor. Wong won a Tony Award for his performance as Song Liling in M. Butterfly, becoming the only actor in Broadway history to receive the Tony Award, Drama Desk Award, Outer Critics Circle Award, Clarence Derwent Award, and Theatre World Award for the same role. He was nominated for a Critic's Choice Television Award for his role as Whiterose in Mr. Robot, for which he also earned an Emmy nomination for Outstanding Guest Actor in a Drama Series.

Wong is known for such roles as Howard Weinstein in the film Father of the Bride, Dr. George Huang on Law & Order: Special Victims Unit, Father Ray Mukada on Oz, Dr. John Lee on Awake, Dr. Henry Wu in the Jurassic Park franchise, Hugo Strange in Gotham, and Ngapoi Ngawang Jigme in the film Seven Years in Tibet. Wong is the host of the HLN medical documentary series Something's Killing Me with BD Wong. He has also done extensive voiceover work and stage acting. Wong voiced Captain Li Shang from the Disney animated film Mulan as well as its 2004 direct-to-video sequel, Mulan II, and the 2005 video game Kingdom Hearts II.

Early life and education
Wong was born and raised in San Francisco, to Roberta Christine Wong (née Leong), a telephone-company supervisor, and William D. Wong, a postal worker. He has one older brother and one younger brother. He is of Chinese descent, with family from Hong Kong. 

Wong attended Lincoln High School, where he discovered his love of acting and starred as the lead in numerous school plays, before attending San Francisco State University. He received an honorary doctorate from San Francisco State University on May 27, 2022.

Career
Wong gained wide attention as a result of his Broadway debut in M. Butterfly opposite John Lithgow. The play won multiple awards, including several for Wong, who at that time ceased using his full name in favor of his initials. He has since ceased the use of punctuation in his initials.

He is notable as the only actor to be honored with the Tony Award, Drama Desk Award, Outer Critics Circle Award, Clarence Derwent Award, and Theatre World Award for the same role. In addition to his long-running stint on Law & Order: Special Victims Unit as FBI psychiatrist Dr. George Huang, he has had recurring roles in All American Girl and played Father Ray Mukada on all six seasons of Oz, with guest appearances on The X-Files and Sesame Street.

On the big screen, he has appeared in The Freshman (1990), the 1991 remake of Father of the Bride and its 1995 sequel, Father of the Bride Part II, Jurassic Park (1993), Executive Decision (1996), and Slappy and the Stinkers (1997). He also provided the voice of Captain Li Shang in Disney's Mulan (1998), its direct-to-video sequel, and the video game Kingdom Hearts II. He returned to Broadway as Linus in a revival of You're a Good Man, Charlie Brown, alongside Anthony Rapp, Roger Bart, and Kristin Chenoweth, and the 2004 revival of Stephen Sondheim's Pacific Overtures.

In 1990 Wong objected to Actor's Equity that the plan to use Welsh actor Jonathan Pryce in the role of The Engineer in the Broadway run of Miss Saigon, which Pryce had played since the beginning of the show's 10-year extended run in London, would take jobs away from actors of Asian descent. Although the union barred Pryce from acting the role in response to Wong's complaint, vociferous opposition from Charlton Heston and a threat by the musical's creator and producer, Cameron Mackintosh, to cancel the American production entirely, induced the union to reverse course. Pryce went on to win a Tony Award for Best Actor in a Musical for the role.

In 2008, Wong starred in the one-man show Herringbone, in which he portrayed 12 roles, at McCarter Theatre at Princeton University. He brought the show to the La Jolla Playhouse in San Diego the following year. In 2012, Wong starred in Herringbone to benefit Dixon Place in New York for two performances. The production, recorded live for a 2014 CD release, was his first appearance in New York of the material, timed to coincide with the 30th anniversary of the original New York production.

In 2014, Wong starred in the U.S. premiere of James Fenton's acclaimed adaptation of The Orphan of Zhao, a classic Chinese legend that has its roots in the fourth century BC, directed by Carey Perloff at American Conservatory Theater (A.C.T.). The Orphan of Zhao is an epic story of self-sacrifice and revenge. In the aftermath of a political coup, a country doctor is forced to sacrifice his son in order to save the last heir of a noble and massacred clan. The Orphan of Zhao was a co-production with La Jolla Playhouse.

Wong announced his departure from the cast of Law & Order: SVU in July 2011, to join another NBC police drama, Awake, in which he portrayed Dr. Johnathan Lee, a confrontational therapist of an LAPD detective (portrayed by Jason Isaacs) who lived in two realities. Wong guest-starred in a thirteenth season episode of Law & Order: SVU titled "Father Dearest" (which aired May 2, 2012).

In 2015, he was named Artist-in-Residence at La Jolla Playhouse. Wong guest-starred on NCIS: New Orleans Episode 1.13 titled "The Walking Dead" (which aired February 3, 2015), where he portrayed Navy Lieutenant Commander Dr. Gabriel Lin.

Wong also played the enigmatic Whiterose, head of the hacker collective Dark Army, who lives a double life as Zhang, the Chinese Minister of State Security, on USA Network's Mr. Robot. He was credited as a recurring role for the show's second season and promoted to main cast for the third season, which debuted October 11, 2017.

On August 13, 2017, Wong began hosting the new HLN series Something's Killing Me with BD Wong. The documentary explores strange and unexplainable, real medical ailments and attacks that may be gradual or descend rapidly. But in either case, if a cause and cure are not found immediately, these real-life patients will die.

Charity work
Wong donates his time and resources to a number of LGBT and arts-related charities, such as the Ali Forney Center, Broadway Cares/Equity Fights AIDS, Materials for the Arts, and Rosie's Theater Kids, of which he is also a board member.

Personal life
Wong is openly gay. He began a long-term relationship with talent agent Richie Jackson in 1988. 

In 2000, the couple had twin sons, Boaz Dov and Jackson Foo Wong through a surrogate mother using Wong’s sperm and an egg donated by Jackson’s sister. Boaz Dov died 90 minutes after birth. 

In 2003, Wong wrote a memoir about his experiences with surrogacy titled Following Foo: The Electronic Adventures of the Chestnut Man (ISBN 9780060529536). 

In 2004, Wong and Jackson ended their relationship. Wong co-parents his son with his ex-partner Jackson and Jackson's husband, Jordan Roth. His son Jackson Foo is openly gay, having come out at age 15.

On October 7, 2018, Wong married Richert John Frederickson Schnorr, his partner of eight years, in Brooklyn, New York City.

Filmography

Film

Television

Video games

Theater

Theme Parks

Audiobooks

Awards and nominations

References

External links

 
 
 

1960 births
Living people
20th-century American male actors
21st-century American male actors
21st-century American memoirists
21st-century American LGBT people
American gay actors
American male actors of Chinese descent
American male actors of Hong Kong descent
American male film actors
American film actors of Asian descent
American male television actors
American male video game actors
American male voice actors
American writers of Chinese descent
Clarence Derwent Award winners
Drama Desk Award winners
American LGBT people of Asian descent
LGBT people from California
Male actors from San Francisco
San Francisco State University alumni
Tony Award winners